Darryl Deyung Harris (born January 14, 1985) is a former American football guard. He was waived during final cuts of the 2011 preseason, and after clearing waivers, he was signed to the Chiefs practice squad on September 4, 2011.

References

External links
 Kansas City Chiefs profile

1985 births
Living people
American football offensive guards
Kansas City Chiefs players
Ole Miss Rebels football players
Sportspeople from Clarksdale, Mississippi
Players of American football from Mississippi